Gowdie is a surname. Notable people with the surname include:

 Isobel Gowdie, Scottish woman who confessed to witchcraft in 1662
 John Gowdie (1682–1762), Scottish academic and Church of Scotland minister

See also
 European goldfinch